Gerla may refer to:

Gerla, a minor planet
Mario Gerla, Italian engineer